The men's triple jump at the 1971 European Athletics Championships was held in Helsinki, Finland, at Helsinki Olympic Stadium on 14 and 15 August 1971.

Medalists

Results

Final
15 August

Qualification
14 August

Participation
According to an unofficial count, 18 athletes from 14 countries participated in the event.

 (1)
 (2)
 (1)
 (1)
 (1)
 (1)
 (1)
 (1)
 (1)
 (3)
 (1)
 (1)
 (2)
 (1)

References

Triple jump
Triple jump at the European Athletics Championships